Ahmed Aboutaleb (born 29 August 1961) is a Dutch politician of Moroccan origin, he is of the Labour Party (PvdA) and a journalist. He has been the Mayor of Rotterdam since 5 January 2009.

Early life and career 
Ahmed Aboutaleb was born on 29 August 1961 in Beni Sidel in Morocco. He grew up as a son of a Riffian Berber Sunni imam in a small village in the Nador Province, Rif region. Together with his mother and brothers he moved to the Netherlands in 1976, when he was 15 years old. Aboutaleb had already noticed how he differed from other kids. As he says in an interview: 'I was so different, such a school dork. I wanted to learn, I wanted to know everything.' 
 
Aboutaleb then studied electrical engineering with a specialisation in Telecommunication at different schools up to the Hogere Technische School where he obtained a Bachelor of Engineering degree.

After graduating he found work as reporter for Veronica TV, NOS-radio and RTL Nieuws. He also worked at the public relations department of the Dutch health ministry. In 1998, Aboutaleb became director of the Forum organisation, an institute dealing with multiculturalism in the Netherlands. He also obtained a post as a civil servant with the municipality of Amsterdam. In 2002, he applied for a government position with the Pim Fortuyn List party but chose not to take it up after disagreeing with the LPF's policies. He joined the PvdA a year later.

Politics 

In January 2004, Aboutaleb succeeded the scandal-plagued Rob Oudkerk as alderman in Amsterdam. Labour Party leader Wouter Bos in his book Wat Wouter Wil said that if the Labour Party was involved in forming the next cabinet after the 2006 election, Aboutaleb would be offered a ministerial post. Aboutaleb himself claimed at the time he wanted to focus on his work as alderman and that it was "important first that the PvdA wins the election."

When the Labour Party really did become part of a new coalition, Aboutaleb was just offered the position of State Secretary for Social Affairs, but said that he did not mind the lesser function, and believed he could learn a lot from Piet Hein Donner, the Minister of Social Affairs.

Along with another deputy minister, Nebahat Albayrak, of Turkish descent, Aboutaleb was criticised by Geert Wilders at the time of their announced appointments for holding dual passports. According to Wilders and his party, government ministers should not have dual citizenship, which they say implies dual allegiance. (Renouncing Moroccan citizenship is almost impossible in practice, as formal approval from the government is required)

On 31 October 2008 Aboutaleb was appointed (in the Netherlands, mayors are not elected) Mayor of Rotterdam. He succeeded the former mayor, Ivo Opstelten on 5 January 2009. Jetta Klijnsma succeeded him as State Secretary. Aboutaleb, who came to the Netherlands from Morocco, is the first mayor of a large city in the Netherlands who is of both immigrant origin and the Muslim faith. He is of Riffian Berber ancestry, and a dual citizen of the Netherlands and Morocco.

In 2021 Aboutaleb was the Joint winner of the 2021 World Mayor award by City Mayors Foundation

Translator
Aboutaleb is also a great fan of poetry, especially Arabic poetry. He translated poetry of Adunis, the most famous living poet of the Arabic language, very little of whose work had been previously translated into Dutch. In June 2010, he presented a few of his translated poems in Arabic in Rotterdam during the festival Poetry International.

Bibliography
 Droom & daad (2015; Dream & action)
 De roep van de stad (2015; The call of the city)

Notes

References

External links

Official
  Ing. A. (Ahmed) Aboutaleb Parlement & Politiek

1961 births
Living people
Aldermen of Amsterdam
Dutch columnists
Dutch electrical engineers
Dutch Muslims
Dutch nonprofit directors
Dutch translators
Dutch people of Riffian descent
Dutch political commentators
Dutch political writers
Dutch reporters and correspondents
Labour Party (Netherlands) politicians
Mayors of Rotterdam
Moroccan emigrants to the Netherlands
People from Nador
State Secretaries for Social Affairs of the Netherlands
Translators from Arabic
20th-century Dutch civil servants
20th-century Dutch male writers
20th-century Dutch journalists
20th-century Dutch poets
21st-century Dutch civil servants
21st-century Dutch male writers
21st-century Dutch journalists
21st-century Dutch poets
21st-century Dutch politicians
Journalists from Amsterdam